Goblin Slayer is an anime series adapted from the light novels of the same title written by Kumo Kagyu and illustrated by Noboru Kannatuki. On January 31, 2021, a second season of the anime TV series was announced at GA FES 2021. On January 5, 2023, the official Twitter account for the series confirmed that LIDENFILMS will be taking over from White Fox as the studio for the second season of the anime. It was also announced that the second season will air in 2023.


Episode list

References

Goblin Slayer episode lists